Chung Kwei is a spam filtering algorithm based on the TEIRESIAS Algorithm for finding coding genes within bulk DNA. It is named after Zhong Kui, a figure in Chinese folklore.

See also
Spam (electronic)
CAN-SPAM Act of 2003
DNSBL
SpamAssassin

External links
Official Report
TEIRESIAS: Sequence Pattern Discovery, from IBM Bioinformatics Group
DNA technique protects against "evil" emails, from NewScientist.com
"DNA analysis" spots e-mail spam, from BBC News

Networking algorithms
Anti-spam